Norbert Fuhr (born 1956) is a professor of computer science
and the leader of the Duisburg Information Engineering Group based at
the University of Duisburg-Essen, Germany.

Education
His first  degree is in technical computer science, which he got from the Department of Electrical Engineering and Information Technology of  the Technical University of Darmstadt in 1980, and in 1986 he received his PhD
(Dr.-Ing) from the Department of Computer Science of the same university on "Probabilistic
Indexing and Retrieval".

Profession
He held a PostDoc position in Darmstadt until
1991, when he was appointed associate professor in the  Computer
Science Department  of  the Technical University of Dortmund. Since 2002, he is a full professor at the
University of Duisburg-Essen.

Honors and awards
Fuhr's dissertation was awarded the  "Gerhard Pietsch Award" of the German Society
of Documentation in 1987. In 2012, he received the  
Gerard Salton Award.

References

External links
Norbert Fuhr - University of Duisburg-Essen

German computer scientists
1956 births
Living people
Academic staff of the University of Duisburg-Essen
Academic staff of the Technical University of Dortmund
Technische Universität Darmstadt alumni
Information retrieval researchers